Sena railway,  also called Shire Highlands railway, Dondo-Malawi railway and North-South Malawi railway, is a railway that connects Dondo, Mozambique, to Chipata, in Zambia. It is  1000 km long, in a 1067 mm gauge.

On the Mozambican stretch, between Dondo and Vila Nova de Fronteira, the managing company is Mozambique Ports and Railways (CFM); on the Malawian stretch, between the cities of Marka and Mchinji, the administration is done by the company Central East African Railways (CEAR). In the short stretch in the territory of Zambia, between the cities of Koloni and Chipata, the railway is controlled by the company Zambia Railways (ZR).

Its main maritime logistics facilities are at the port of Beira and port of Nacala.

History 
Initially the Sena railway had the function of connecting the Protectorate of Nyasaland (currently Malawi) from north to south, using waterways to reach seaports.

Construction
In 1901, the Shire Highlands Railway Company was formed in Blantyre by British investors. He soon obtained a concession to build a railway connecting Nsanje, on the Shire River (at the southernmost point of the protectorate), to Mangochi, at the southern end of Lake Malawi, via Chiromo and Blantyre. The first section of this line, between Nsanje and Chiromo, was opened to traffic on 1 September 1904. The contract for the construction of a branch was awarded to the British South Africa Company, connecting Chindio and Nsanje, the latter becoming an important waterway connection port with the maritime city of Beira. The irregular river flow in the region — sometimes with large and destructive floods, sometimes with severe droughts — made safe navigation almost impossible, causing this option to be discarded and the continuation of a railway line to Quelimane to be abandoned.One of Africa’s longest bridges, 86-year-old Ponte Dona Ana gets a much-needed facelift. Club of Mozambique. 26 de maio de 2017.

The effective planning of what is currently the Sena railway would only begin in 1912, when a common understanding was signed between Nyasaland and the Portuguese administration in Mozambique, for the construction of a railway line that would connect Beira to the African Great Lakes.

Between 1919 and 1922, Trans-Zambezia Railways, company winner of the tender for the construction of the southern section, concluded the connection between Dondo and Vila de Sena, in front of the city of Nhamayabué (or Mutarara), on the Zambezi River. The rest of the railway on the Mozambican side, between Nhamayabué and Vila Nova de Fronteira, was slowly completed until 1930. In 1930, therefore, the railway already connected Beira, Nhamayabué, Vila Nova de Fronteira, Nsanje, Chiromo and Blantyre, mainly transporting cotton from southern Malawi and from the Sena-Nhamayabué region, in addition to the sugar production by the company Sena Sugar Estates. The permission for the construction of the north-lakes stretch, beyond Blantyre, was later transferred to the company Central African Railways.

In order to cross the Zambezi River and continue the railroad operation, a ferry service was chosen, which paralyzed during the river's drought period. To eliminate the movement of the ferry, Nyasaland Railways Limited (resulting from the merger of the Shire Highlands Railway Company with the Central African Railways) and Trans-Zambezia Railways opted for the construction of the Dona Ana Bridge; the final cost of the bridge was £ 1.74 million and, for the rest of the 20th century, did not generate enough traffic to pay the interest rate, let alone repay the loans raised to build it.

The extension into Malawian territory towards the north, between Blantyre and Salima, was completed in 1935, reaching the important port of Chipoka, one of the largest on Lake Malawi.

In the 1940s, the Portuguese colonial government for Mozambique built a railway branch linking Dona Ana station, in Nhamayabué, to the coal mines of Moatize. The Dona Ana-Moatize branch line became operational in 1949, with a length of 254 km.

In the 1970s, with Mozambican independence, the extension of the line was agreed, which would depart from Salima towards the west, reaching Lilongwe and Mchinji. The works were completed and inaugurated in 1979.

Effects of civil war 

The Sena railway was the main bulk transport link to Malawi until 1979, when it was destroyed by RENAMO forces in the Mozambican Civil War. As the Sena railway was interconnected with the Nacala railway, at the station in the Malawian city of Nkaya, since 1970, Malawi had its second rail connection with the port of Nacala, in Mozambique. In 1984, the Nacala railway link was also lost, when the Nacala railway was destroyed by RENAMO forces.

Reopening and expanding to the north
After the signing of the Rome General Peace Accords in 1992, there was an effort to reopen traffic, but devastating floods in 1997 in the valley of the Shire and Ruo rivers destroyed the important Bangula-Chiromo Road-Rail Bridge, connecting the villages of Bangula and Chiromo. The event defined the state of degradation of the line between Blantyre and Nhamayabué, which has been inoperative since then. The Bangula-Chiromo bridge was rebuilt in 2003, but the section of the line between Blantyre and Nhamayabué was left behind for being more sinuous and slower, in addition to the low draft and high cargo movement of the port of Beira. It fell into disuse as of 2010, with cargoes being redirected to the Nacala railway.

The subsequent discovery of mining areas in northeastern Zambia caused the railway to be extended from Mchinji (Malawi) to the locality of Chipata (Zambia). The works for this extension were completed in 2019, with Chinese funding.

In 2021, the Mozambican government started the rehabilitation of the section connecting Nhamayabué to Marka, with the expectation of having an auxiliary route for the transport of rail cargo from the south of Malawi. At the same time, the Malawian government tendered the recovery of the section between Bangula and Marka, establishing as a priority the recovery between Bangula and Blantyre (Limbe) in a second moment.

Main railway stations
The main railway stations of the Sena railway are:
Dondo (junction railway station)
Caia
Sena
Nhamayabué/Dona Ana (junction railway station)
Vila Nova de Fronteira
Marka
Nsanje
Bangula
Luchenza
Blantyre/Limbe
Nkaya (junction railway station)
Chipoka
Salima
Lilongwe
Mchinji
Chipata

Railway branches 
In 1949, the Dona Ana–Moatize branch line, 254 km long, was definitively opened, connecting the very rich areas of the Benga-Moatize coal belt.

It also has the Inhamitanga–Marromeu branch, which is 88 km long.

References 

3 ft 6 in gauge railways in Malawi
3 ft 6 in gauge railways in Mozambique
3 ft 6 in gauge railways in Zambia
Railway lines in Mozambique